Tell Hoch Rafqa is an archaeological site 1 km north of Hoch er Rafqa, 4 km west of a bridge over the Litani River in the Beqaa Mohafazat (Governorate) in Lebanon. It dates at least to the Early Bronze Age.

References

Baalbek District
Neolithic settlements
Archaeological sites in Lebanon
Great Rift Valley